Super Shot (also known as Freefall or Cannonball) is a type of drop tower amusement ride. There are 12 seats per car. The ride ascends the tower by cable with passengers facing outwards from the ride. When the car reaches the top, it drops rapidly. As the car reaches the bottom of the tower, it slows through magnetic or air-powered brakes.

Accidents
In 2016, a 47-year-old female was injured while riding a Super Shot in Frederick County, Virginia. Her seat had been incorrectly installed and became detached from the ride, causing her to fall .

References

Drop tower rides